Kunzea cambagei, commonly known as the Cambage kunzea is a flowering plant in the myrtle family, Myrtaceae and is endemic to a small area of New South Wales. It is a small shrub with egg-shaped leaves and clusters of cream-coloured to yellowish flowers near the end of the branches. It is only known from areas near Mount Werong in the Kanangra-Boyd National Park and Berrima.

Description
The flowers are cream-coloured to yellowish and arranged in rounded groups of five to thirteen near the ends of the branches.

Taxonomy and naming
Kunzea cambagei was first formally described in 1913 by Joseph Maiden and Ernst Betche from a specimen collected by Richard Hind Cambage. The description was published in Proceedings of the Linnean Society of New South Wales. The specific epithet (cambagei) honours the collector of the type specimen.

Distribution and habitat
The Cambage kunzea grows in moist heath mainly on the Central Tablelands of New South Wales.

Conservation
Kunzea cambagei is listed as "Vulnerable" under the Commonwealth Government Environment Protection and Biodiversity Conservation Act 1999 (EPBC) Act and as "Vulnerable" under the New South Wales  Threatened Species Conservation Act 1995. The main threats to the species are inappropriate fire regimes and habitat degradation caused by road widening, rubbish dumping and trail bikes.

References

External links 
 

cambagei
Flora of New South Wales
Myrtales of Australia
Plants described in 1913
Endemic flora of Australia